This is a list of places on the Victorian Heritage Register in the City of Moonee Valley in Victoria, Australia. The Victorian Heritage Register is maintained by the Heritage Council of Victoria.

The Victorian Heritage Register, as of 2020, lists the following 24 state-registered places within the City of Moonee Valley:

References

Moonee Valley
City of Moonee Valley